Smardzewo may refer to the following places:
Smardzewo, Lubusz Voivodeship (west Poland)
Smardzewo, Płock County in Masovian Voivodeship (east-central Poland)
Smardzewo, Płońsk County in Masovian Voivodeship (east-central Poland)
Smardzewo, West Pomeranian Voivodeship (north-west Poland)